Sankt Bernhard-Frauenhofen is a town in the district of Horn in Lower Austria in Austria.  21.03% of the municipality are forested. It lies in the Waldviertel area, in the valley of the river Taffa. There are 95 agricultural companies and 67 non-agricultural jobs. 597 persons are employed. The activity rate was 48.17%.

Subdivisions
Sankt Bernhard-Frauenhofen is subdivided into the following Katastralgemeinden:
Frauenhofen
Groß Burgstall
Grünberg
Poigen
St. Bernhard
Strögen

Population

References

Cities and towns in Horn District